Craig Adams may refer to:

Craig Adams (musician) (born 1962), British musician
Craig Adams (ice hockey) (born 1977), Canadian ice hockey player in the National Hockey League
Craig Adams (footballer) (born 1974), English footballer

See also
Adams (surname)